Horace Lawson Hunley (December 29, 1823 – October 15, 1863) was a Confederate marine engineer during the American Civil War. He developed early hand-powered submarines, the most famous of which was posthumously named for him, CSS H. L. Hunley.

Biography  
Horace Lawson Hunley was born in Sumner County, Tennessee to Louisa Harden Lawson and John Hunley. After relocating to New Orleans, Hunley studied law at the University of Louisiana and was admitted to the bar in 1849. He served in the Louisiana State Legislature and practiced law in New Orleans.

In response to the Union blockade of southern ports the Confederate government offered bounties of up to $50,000 to anyone who sank a Union warship. In the summer of 1861, the Reverend Franklin Smith advocated southern businessmen pursue submarine warfare, in writings to Southern newspapers. In order to prevent her capture, the submarine had to be scuttled during trials in Lake Pontchartrain when New Orleans fell to Union forces in early 1862.

The second submarine was towed to Fort Morgan and attempted an attack on the Union blockade of Mobile. However, the submarine foundered in foul weather and sank in the mouth of Mobile Bay.

Hunley organized and arranged funding for a third submarine. The third boat was one-third financed by Horace, one-third by E. C. Singer (an associate of Horace's in the Confederate Secret Service and yes, of the sewing machine family) and the remaining third to Singer associates R. W. Dunn, Guss Whitney (yes, of the cotton gin) and J. D. Breaman. *Horace did not name the sub after himself. Singer named the third vessel the HUNLEY to honor Horace's devotion and efforts to his sub projects. After a demonstration held on July 31, 1863 was successful by sinking an old barge the submarine was transported to Charleston harbor and presented to General P.G.T. Beauregard. Five men from the first crew of H. L. HUNLEY died during early tests when she was accidentally swamped by the wake of a passing ship through her open hatches; four managed to escape. Another crew was recruited by Hunley who promised Beauregard a timely attempt. This crew included experienced crew members from earlier experiments. On October 15, 1863, Hunley took his turn at command during a routine exercise. The vessel again sank, and this time all eight crew members were killed, including Hunley himself.  The vessel was later raised and used again in 1864 in the first successful sinking of an enemy vessel by a submarine in naval history.  The operation was also fateful for H. L. HUNLEY herself, which sank a third time, and for the second time losing all hands.

Upon recovery of the submarine and associated artifacts, it was discovered that the spar torpedo exploded while still attached to the spar. The system was designed to have the submarine ram the torpedo barb into the hull, back off to a safe distance, then activate the ignition via a long-length of rope. The submarine was never intended to be that close to the explosion and probably suffered significant structural damage, which contributed to her loss.

Horace Lawson Hunley was buried with full military honors at Magnolia Cemetery in Charleston, South Carolina, on November 8, 1863.

References

Bibliography

External links

 Friends of the Hunley
 

1823 births
1863 deaths
19th-century American engineers
American marine engineers
Confederate States of America military personnel killed in the American Civil War
Confederate States Navy officers
Inventors killed by their own invention
People from Sumner County, Tennessee
Submarine pioneers
Deaths due to shipwreck
Burials at Magnolia Cemetery (Charleston, South Carolina)